Zimbabwe competed at the 2020 Summer Olympics in Tokyo. Originally scheduled to take place from 24 July to 9 August 2020, the Games were postponed to 23 July to 8 August 2021, due to the COVID-19 pandemic. It is the nation's tenth consecutive appearance at the Summer Olympics as an independent nation under the name Zimbabwe, after appearing as Southern Rhodesia and Rhodesia in the colonial era.

The Zimbabwe Olympic Committee (ZOC) stood with five athletes at the Olympiad, which was the second-smallest Zimbabwean team since their debut in 1928. For the third consecutive Olympiad, Zimbabwe left the games without any medals. Golfer Scott Vincent was the only Zimbabwean athlete within reach of the medals. He tied for 16th place in men's golf, finishing four strokes behind bronze medalist Pan Cheng-tsung.

Competitors
The following is the list of number of competitors in the Games.

Athletics

Zimbabwe received a universality slot from the World Athletics to send a male track and field athlete to the Olympics.

Track & road events

Golf

Zimbabwe entered one golfer for the first time into the Olympic tournament. Scott Vincent (world no. 239) qualified directly among the top 60 eligible players for the men's event based on the IGF World Rankings.

Rowing

Zimbabwe qualified one boat in the men's single sculls for the Games by winning the silver medal and securing the second of five berths available at the 2019 FISA African Olympic Qualification Regatta in Tunis, Tunisia.

Qualification Legend: FA=Final A (medal); FB=Final B (non-medal); FC=Final C (non-medal); FD=Final D (non-medal); FE=Final E (non-medal); FF=Final F (non-medal); SA/B=Semifinals A/B; SC/D=Semifinals C/D; SE/F=Semifinals E/F; QF=Quarterfinals; R=Repechage

Swimming

Zimbabwe received a universality invitation from FINA to send two top-ranked swimmers (one per gender) in their respective individual events to the Olympics, based on the FINA Points System of June 28, 2021.

See also
 Zimbabwe at the 2020 Summer Paralympics

References

Nations at the 2020 Summer Olympics
2020
2021 in Zimbabwean sport